Kozyr is a Ukrainian and Belarusian surname. Notable people with the surname include:

 Aleksandr Kozyr (1903–1961), Soviet-Ukrainian film producer
 Artsem Kozyr (born 1990), Belarusian sprint canoeist
 Igor Kozyr (born 1966), Belarusian wrestler
 Valentyna Kozyr (born 1950), Soviet-Ukrainian athlete

See also
 

Belarusian-language surnames
Ukrainian-language surnames